Cerimetry or cerimetric titration, also known as cerate oximetry, is a method of volumetric chemical analysis developed by Ion Atanasiu. It is a redox titration in which an iron(II)–1,10-phenanthroline complex (ferroin) color change indicates the end point. Ferroin can be reversibly discolored in its oxidized form upon titration with a Ce4+ solution. The use of cerium(IV) salts as reagents for volumetric analysis was first proposed in the middle of 19th century, but systematic studies did not start until about 70 years later. Standard solutions can be prepared from different Ce4+ salts, but often cerium sulfate is chosen.

Since cerimetry is linked to the Fe3+/Fe2+ redox pair, it can be used for analyses of nonstoichiometric levels that either oxidize Fe2+ or reduce Fe3+. For the case of oxidation, a precise excess of high-purity crystalline Mohr's salt is added upon the oxide digestion in aqueous hydrogen chloride (HCl), while for the case of reduction, an excess of 1 M iron trichloride (FeCl3) is added. In both cases, Fe2+ ions will be titrated subsequently. Because the Ce4+ solution is prone to hydrolysis, the titration is done in a strongly HCl-acidic solution into which some phosphoric acid (H3PO4) is added to obtain a less colored phosphato complex of Fe3+.

According to tabulated values of standard potentials at pH 0 for the first-row transition metals, any nonstoichiometry below the following oxidation states will reduce 1 M FeCl3 solution whereas any nonstoichiometry above them will oxidize the Mohr's salt: Ti4+, V4+, Cr3+, Mn2+, Co2+, and Ni2+. In addition, any nonstoichiometry in the Fe(III)–Fe(II) range is titrated directly with no additives, any nonstoichiometry below Fe2+ will reduce 1 M FeCl3 whereas any nonstoichiometry above Fe3+ will oxidize Mohr's salt. In the second- and third-row transition metals, only the early elements would be suitable for the titration, and the limiting oxidation states are Zr4+, Nb5+, Mo4+, Hf4+, Ta5+, and W6+. Standard potentials involving rhenium ions are too close to E0 for Fe3+/Fe2+ as well as to each other. Nonstoichiometry of oxides containing several elements in oxidation states suitable for cerimetry is determined in one titration.

See also
 Iodometry
 Redox titration
 Nonstoichiometry
 Redox indicator
 Oxidizing agent
 Reducing agent

References

Romanian inventions
Analytical chemistry
Cerium
Titration